The Valley of Death or Winnetou and Shatterhand in the Valley of Death is a 1968 western film directed by Harald Reinl and starring Lex Barker, Pierre Brice and Rik Battaglia. It was the last in a series of films based on Karl May novels. These had previously enjoyed major commercial success, although this film's box office returns were disappointing. It was effectively a remake of an earlier film in the series Treasure of the Silver Lake.

It was shot at the Spandau Studios in Berlin and on location in Yugoslavia. The film's sets were designed by the art director Vladimir Tadej.

Cast

References

External links
 

1968 films
1968 Western (genre) films
1960s historical films
German Western (genre) films
West German films
German historical films
Italian Western (genre) films
Films directed by Harald Reinl
Winnetou films
Constantin Film films
Films set in the 19th century
Films set in New Mexico
Yugoslav historical films
Yugoslav Western (genre) films
Films shot at Spandau Studios
1960s German-language films
1960s German films
1960s Italian films
Foreign films set in the United States